Federico "Fede" Nicolás Cartabia (born 20 January 1993) is an Argentine professional footballer who plays for Emirati club Shabab Al Ahli Club as a winger or attacking midfielder.

Club career

Valencia
Born in Rosario, Santa Fe, Cartabia moved to Spain and Valencia CF at the age of 13, going on to represent several of its youth sides. He made his senior debut in the 2012–13 season, with the reserves in the Segunda División B.

Cartabia started playing with the first team in the 2013 pre-season, after impressing manager Miroslav Đukić. He renewed his contract in late July, with the new link running until June 2017 and having a buyout clause of €20 million.

Cartabia made his debut in La Liga on 17 August 2013, starting and playing 65 minutes in a 1–0 home win against Málaga CF. He scored his first goals for the Che on 24 October, with a brace in the 5–1 victory over FC St. Gallen in the group stage of the UEFA Europa League.

On 11 July 2014, Cartabia was loaned out to newly promoted Córdoba CF in a season-long deal with a buying option. He made his debut for the Andalusians on 25 August, coming on as a substitute for Daniel Pinillos in a 2–0 loss at Real Madrid. His first goal in the top flight arrived five days later, when he closed a 1–1 home draw with RC Celta de Vigo.

Deportivo
On 30 July 2015, Cartabia was loaned to another club in the top division, Deportivo de La Coruña, for one year. In January 2017 he cut ties with Valencia and agreed to a permanent five-year contract at the Galicians, being then loaned to S.C. Braga of the Portuguese Primeira Liga for five months.

Club statistics

 Assist Goals

Honours
Shabab Al Ahli
UAE Super Cup: 2020
UAE League Cup: 2020–21

References

External links

1993 births
Living people
Argentine people of Italian descent
Argentine emigrants to Spain
Naturalised citizens of Spain
Argentine footballers
Footballers from Rosario, Santa Fe
Association football wingers
La Liga players
Segunda División players
Segunda División B players
Valencia CF Mestalla footballers
Valencia CF players
Córdoba CF players
Deportivo de La Coruña players
Primeira Liga players
S.C. Braga players
UAE Pro League players
Shabab Al-Ahli Club players
Argentina under-20 international footballers
Argentine expatriate footballers
Expatriate footballers in Spain
Expatriate footballers in Portugal
Expatriate footballers in the United Arab Emirates
Argentine expatriate sportspeople in Spain
Argentine expatriate sportspeople in Portugal
Argentine expatriate sportspeople in the United Arab Emirates